Duclair may refer to:

 Duclair, commune in Seine-Maritime, France
 Canton of Duclair, canton in Seine-Maritime, France
 Duclair duck, duck breed named after the commune of Duclair in Seine-Maritime, France
 Anthony Duclair (born 1995), Canadian ice hockey player
 Farell Duclair (born 1972), Canadian football player

See also
 Épinay-sur-Duclair, commune in Seine-Maritime, France
 Sainte-Marguerite-sur-Duclair, commune in Seine-Maritime, France